Creative Cities is an international project designed and managed by the British Council. It shares experiences across Europe on the ways creativity, entrepreneurship and innovation can help improving people's lives – making cities better places to live, work and play.

About

Background
With over 70% of Europe's population now living in urban areas, cities have a vital role in delivering economic and social well-being for Europe. A new generation of urban influencers and innovators is emerging which recognises that culture and creativity is central to addressing the challenges cities face. Creative Cities supports this new generation, providing opportunities to develop and share ideas which make Europe's cities better places to live, work and play.

British Council proposal
The British Council developed the Creative Cities project in 2007, in partnership with a range of cities and organisations active in developing innovative approaches to city policy. Individuals taking part in project events develop new skills and build new contacts across Europe. Cities which join the project network have an opportunity to establish competitive advantage for themselves and attract creative talent, and in so doing set the foundations for future economic growth. 
The Creative Cities project is running in the UK, Poland, Czech Republic, Hungary, Slovakia, Slovenia, Ukraine, Sweden, Norway, Denmark, Finland, Estonia, Latvia, Lithuania and Russia.

Short description

Creative Cities emerge out of the search for new solutions to post-industrial urban problems, including high crime rate, degradation of urban infrastructures, and social separation. 

Creative Cities explores new ways to improve quality of life in cities by involving young professionals from various backgrounds. During the course of the project these young people will acquire knowledge, networks, skills and tools to give them more influence on decisions made about the urban environment they live in. This will enable them to make a difference on a range of issues such as: public spaces, arts and social activities, and cultural policy.

The three core project strands are: Future City Game, Urban Ideas Bakery and Urban Forum. In addition to the three strands, the project provides platforms to enable young social innovators in Europe to keep in touch with the project and each other: an interactive website, a Facebook group, Twitter and an e-mail newsletter.

In recent years, the concept of the creative city was increasingly used as part of national branding campaigns in Europe (e.g. Creative Britain) and adopted by cities and organizations. Amid this development, there emerge the so-called creativity indices, which outlined and measured various interpretations of creativity in cities and countries. These result in an extremely diverse range of activities and initiatives that contribute to the realization of the creative city model, which is aligned with the goal of the Creative Cities to discover social innovation, creativity, and new thinking to make cities better places to live in.

Methods and tools

Future City Game
 Generates new ideas on how to improve the quality of life either in a specific area within a city, the city as a whole, or in response to the common challenges facing cities around the world.
 A one-day or two-day event involving city inhabitants from diverse backgrounds, representing different disciplines and led by a trained games-master.
 Uses a team based process, with a unique and innovative methodology developed by the British Council in partnership with CLES – Centre for Local Economic Strategies and Urbis – Manchester's Centre of Urban Life.

Urban Ideas Bakery
 Builds skills and shares experience on how cities 'bake ideas' – that is turn them into practical solutions.
 A problem-solving and planning process that puts people at the centre of social innovation; it includes a two-day international event engaging social innovators and experts from across Europe and local community representatives.

Urban Forum
The urban forum consists of international conferences and workshops providing a forum for ongoing debate on the role that creativity, entrepreneurship and innovation play in urban development. In a report to the UK Parliament, it was said that this forum has also been engaging young politicians to explore issues emphasized in the Creative Cities initiative alongside issues that revolve around people, politics, and youth action. The urban forum also involves creative events which demonstrate new ways cities can inspire creativity in the community.

References

Notes
Kreativni mesta
Creative Planning
Creative Cities article in Polytika
Article about Future City Game
Gdansk European Capital of Culture article
Article about public participation in Warsaw Gazette

Further reading 
 Creative Hubs: Understanding the New Economy
 The Development of Entrepreneurship in Creative Industries with Reference to Bandung as a Creative City
 The Creative Economy: An Introductory Guide

External links
 Creative Cities official website
 Breakthrough Cities Report
 British Council
 Centre for Local Economic Strategies
 Village, the Russian blog site about Creative Cities

City